Rusyn may refer to:

 Rusyn people, an East Slavic people
 Pannonian Rusyn people, a branch of Rusyn people
 Lemkos, a branch of Rusyn (or Ukrainian) people
 Boykos, a branch of Rusyn (or Ukrainian) people
 Rusyn language, an East Slavic language
 Pannonian Rusyn language, a variant of Rusyn language
 Lemko language, a variant of Rusyn language
 Rusyn, one of several self-appellations of East Slavs (Ruthenians)
 Rusyn (surname), a surname

See also 
 
 Rusin (disambiguation)
 Russian (disambiguation)
 Russin (disambiguation)
 Rüthen, town in the district of Soest, in North Rhine-Westphalia, Germany.
 Ruthenian (disambiguation)

Language and nationality disambiguation pages